Rhombophyllum rhomboideum, the diamond-leaved rhombophyllum, is a species of flowering plant in the family Aizoaceae, native to the eastern Cape Provinces of South Africa. A succulent, it has gained the Royal Horticultural Society's Award of Garden Merit.

References

rhomboideum
Endemic flora of South Africa
Flora of the Cape Provinces
Plants described in 1927